Bag of Money may refer to:
Money bag
"Bag of Money", a song by American rapper Wale
"Bag of Money", an episode of Hey Arnold!